Cao Bao (died 196) was a military officer serving under Tao Qian, the Governor of Xu Province, during the late Eastern Han dynasty of China. He became a subordinate of Tao Qian's successor, Liu Bei, after Tao's death in 194. He was killed by Zhang Fei in 196 after a quarrel.

In historical records
The only known information about Cao Bao in history comes from Pei Songzhi's annotations to Chen Shou's Records of the Three Kingdoms (Sanguozhi), which recorded the history of the late Eastern Han dynasty and the Three Kingdoms period.

An annotation from the Yingxiong Ji (英雄記; "Records of Heroes", authored by Wang Can) in the Sanguozhi recorded: 

Another annotation, also from the Yingxiong Ji, in the Sanguozhi, recorded a different account: 

Sima Guang used the second account when he compiled the Zizhi Tongjian.

In Romance of the Three Kingdoms
Cao Bao's conflict with Zhang Fei was dramatised in the 14th-century historical novel Romance of the Three Kingdoms.

In the novel, Cao Bao was Lü Bu's father-in-law. He was coerced by Zhang Fei to drink wine even though he insisted that he abstained from alcohol. When Cao Bao pleaded with Zhang Fei to stop forcing him to drink by asking the latter to "spare him in consideration of his son-in-law", Zhang became furious because he hated Lü Bu. He ordered his men to flog Cao Bao 50 times and only gave up when the other officers begged him to stop. Cao Bao bore a grudge against Zhang Fei for the beating, so he secretly contacted Lü Bu and assisted his son-in-law in seizing control of Xiapi. Zhang Fei was drunk when Lü Bu attacked the city so he lost the battle and fled from Xiapi. Cao Bao led about a hundred soldiers to pursue Zhang Fei but ended up being killed by the latter.

See also
 Lists of people of the Three Kingdoms

References

 Chen, Shou (3rd century). Records of the Three Kingdoms (Sanguozhi).
 
 Luo, Guanzhong (14th century). Romance of the Three Kingdoms (Sanguo Yanyi).
 Pei, Songzhi (5th century). Annotations to Records of the Three Kingdoms (Sanguozhi zhu).
 Sima, Guang (1084). Zizhi Tongjian.

2nd-century births
196 deaths
Tao Qian and associates
Lü Bu and associates
Generals under Liu Bei